Geraldo Antônio Martins (11 January 1940 – 30 March 2018), known as Geraldino or simply Geraldo, is a Brazilian retired footballer who played as a left back.

Honours
Cruzeiro
Campeonato Mineiro: 1961

Santos
Intercontinental Cup: 1963
Copa Libertadores: 1963
Taça Brasil: 1963, 1964
Torneio Rio – São Paulo: 1963
Campeonato Paulista: 1964, 1965, 1967

References

External links
UOL Esporte biography 

1940 births
2018 deaths
Sportspeople from Minas Gerais
Brazilian footballers
Association football defenders
Cruzeiro Esporte Clube players
Santos FC players
Associação Portuguesa de Desportos players
Brazil international footballers